Sethu Lakshmi is an Indian actress who predominantly works in Malayalam films and television soap operas.She started her career as a theatre artist and later rose into fame with character roles.

Personal life

Sethulakshmi is from Thiruvananthapuram, Kerala. Her husband is a theatre actor and make-up artist. She completed her Natana Bhooshan in 1963. She has four children: three daughters and one son. Her daughter Lakshmi is a theatre artist, while son Kishore is a theatre and mimicry artist. Kishore was a member of Boys, a team in Comedy Express, a comedy-based programme on Asianet. They had their own troupe, Chirayinkeezh Anugraha.

Acting career

Sethulakshmi made her acting debut in 2006 with the serial Suryodayam directed by Balachandran Menon aired in Doordarshan. She acted in Sathyan Anthikad's films Rasathanthram, Vinodayathra and Bhagyadevatha. Her other films include Ee Kanni Koodi, Left Right Left, How Old Are You, 36 Vayadhinile, Utopiayile Rajavu.
Her performance in the comeback film of Manju Warrier, How Old Are You brought in a lot a praises and accolades . She portrayed the same character in Tamil remake 36 Vayadhinile with Jyothika marking her debut in Tamil.

She won State theatre awards four times in 2 categories. For her acting brilliance in How Old Are You, Sethulakshmi won the best supporting actress for Kerala State Film Award 2014.

Her well known character in  serials are Appachiyamma of Moonumani, Rathnamma of Aliyan VS Aliyan and Mohakadal.

Dramas
 Chinna Pappan
 Bhagyajathakam
 Dravidavritham 
 Mankolangal
 Lahari

Television

Other Works

Awards and honours

Filmography

References

External links
 

Actresses from Thiruvananthapuram
Actresses in Malayalam television
Indian television actresses
21st-century Indian actresses
Actresses in Malayalam cinema
Indian film actresses
Actresses in Hindi television
Living people
Actresses in Tamil cinema
1943 births